Tomasz Jerzy Kulesza (born 14 June 1959 in Jarosław) is a Polish politician. He was elected to the Sejm in 22 Krosno district on 25 September 2005, with 5,621 votes, as a candidate from the Civic Platform list. He was re-elected in 2007 and 2011.

On 13 October 2022, Kulesza joined the newly-launched Centre for Poland, which will be part of the Polish Coalition.

References

See also
Members of Polish Sejm 2005-2007
Members of Polish Sejm 2007-2011
Members of Polish Sejm 2011-2015

1959 births
Civic Platform politicians
Living people
Members of the Polish Sejm 2005–2007
Members of the Polish Sejm 2007–2011
Members of the Polish Sejm 2011–2015